

Æthelric (or Athelric) was a medieval Bishop of Sherborne.

Æthelric was consecrated in 1002. He died between 1011 and 1012.

Citations

References

External links

Bishops of Sherborne (ancient)
1010s deaths
11th-century English Roman Catholic bishops
Year of birth unknown
Year of death uncertain